Chintalapalli is a village in Kurnool district of Andhra Pradesh. It has a population of around 1,500.

References 

Villages in Kurnool district